Death-Shield is a fictional character appearing in American comic books published by Marvel Comics.

Fictional character biography
Death-Shield is a mercenary trained by the Taskmaster.  The Taskmaster is under contract by the Red Skull to create a team of mercenaries who would be capable of defeating Spider-Man. The trio were patterned after the superheroes: Captain America, Hawkeye, and Spider-Man.  The characters were called: Death-Shield, Jagged Bow, and Blood Spider. Solo joined the fray on the side of the wall-crawler and helps to defeat the three villains and thwart the machinations of the Red Skull, who was using the mercenaries to guard private files sought by Spider-Man in reference to his parents.

Years later, Blood Spider, Death-Shield, and Jagged Bow appear among the criminals vying for the multimillion-dollar bounty that was placed on Agent Venom's head by Lord Ogre. The trio's attempt on Agent Venom's life is interrupted by competing mercenaries Constrictor and Lord Deathstrike.

Crime Master, with the help of Blood Spider, Death-Shield, and Jagged Bow, later tries to steal a damaged Rigellian Recorder from Deadpool and the Mercs for Money.

Powers and abilities
Death-Shield carries a shield and is very proficient in using it as a weapon.

References

External links
 

Comics characters introduced in 1992
Characters created by David Michelinie
Characters created by Jerry Bingham
Characters created by Mark Bagley
Fictional shield fighters
Marvel Comics supervillains